Pistacia malayana is a species of plant in the family Anacardiaceae. It is endemic to Peninsular Malaysia.

References

malayana
Endemic flora of Peninsular Malaysia
Least concern plants
Taxonomy articles created by Polbot